Carry is an English and German feminine given name, nickname and surname, which serves as an alternate form of Carrie and a diminutive form of several names including Carola, Carol, Carlotta, Carolin, Carolina and Caroline. Notable people referred to by this name include the following:

Given name
Carry Somers (born 1966), British fashion designer

Nickname
Carry Geijssen, nickname of Carolina Cornelia Catharina Geijssen (born 1947), Dutch speed skater
Carry Hauser, nickname of Carl Maria Hauser (1895–1985), Austrian painter, stage set designer and poet
Carry van Bruggen, whose birthname was Caroline Lea de Haan and pen name was Justine Abbing (1881–1932), Dutch writer
Cash and Carry Pyle, an alternate nickname of C. C. Pyle, whose full name was Charles C. Pyle (1882–1939), American theater owner, sports agent and entrepreneur
 CarryMinati, whose birth name is Ajey Nagar (born 1999), Indian YouTuber

Surname
David Carry (born 1981), Scottish swimmer
Julius Carry (1952–2008), American actor
Scoops Carry, nickname of George Dorman Carry (1915–1970), American jazz musician
Sharon Carry (born 1950), Canadian education administrator
Sincere Carry (born 1999), American basketball player

See also

Cardy (surname)
Carey (given name)
Carly (name)
Carr (surname)
Carré (surname)
Carri
Carro (surname)
Carty
Cary (given name)
Corry (surname)
Curry (surname)
McCarry

Notes

English feminine given names
German feminine given names